Caernarfon Airworld Aviation Museum is an air museum located on the former Royal Air Force station at Llandwrog, near Caernarfon in North Wales.

History 
The airfield was known as RAF Llandwrog, opening in January 1941 as a RAF Bomber Command airfield for training gunners, radio operators and navigators and closed after the end of the Second World War in 1945. Due to the large numbers of aircraft crashing in the nearby mountains of Snowdonia, it was here that the RAF Mountain Rescue Service was formed in 1943. Postwar, the airfield was used as a storage facility for chemical weapons recovered from Europe. It reopened in 1969 and remains in civil operation today as Caernarfon Airport.

The museum opened in 1988, and is located in a purpose built hangar.

Aircraft on display 
The museum has the following aircraft on display:
 Westland Whirlwind helicopter
 Gloster Javelin (nose section)
 Hawker Sea Hawk
 de Havilland Vampire T11
 Hawker Hunter F1
 BAe Harrier T2
 Slingsby Kirby Cadet glider
 Bristol Sycamore helicopter (cabin)
 Vickers Varsity (cockpit)

See also
List of aviation museums

External links 

Airworld Aviation Museum

Military aviation museums in the United Kingdom